Larry Jones (born September 22, 1942) is an American former professional basketball player. He most notably played in the American Basketball Association (ABA), where he was the first player to reach 5,000 career points. He also had shorter stints in the rival National Basketball Association (NBA).

College career
Jones only started playing regularly for East High in Columbus, Ohio during his senior year. As a 6'2 forward he wasn't considered big enough by major colleges and was recruited by the University of Toledo for whom he played in the Mid-American Conference (MAC) from 1960.
He was repositioned as a guard by Toledo coach Ed Melvin and became a major player for the Rockets.

Jones was a unanimous selection in the 1962 All-MAC First Team chosen by the conference's coaches, having made the Second Team a year earlier.
He injured his wrist in Toledo's season opener against Butler on 1 December 1962 after a heavy fall where he also hit his head. Jones, who scored 35 points in the game, managed to play the last five minutes of the game with what was thought to be a sprained wrist. It later emerged the wrist was fractured and he had to redshirt the rest of the 1962-63 season. His eligibility was then extended for another season.

One year later, in December 1963, he helped Toledo score a "monumental upset" over New York University (at the time ranked second nationally). His coach Melvin described him as a "tremendous total player - rebounder, playmaker, scorer and defender" for his form that season after he averaged over 27 points the four previous games.
Jones, the Toledo captain and all-time second highest scorer, suffered a fractured knuckle on 13 January 1964 when he fell on ice after a practice. Before he could return from injury, he was suspended in early February for undisclosed disciplinary reasons.
It later emerged that he had been involved in a paternity suit. However all charges were dropped, his name was cleared and he was reinstated in early March, allowing him to play the final two games of the season.
He was an honorable mention All-American in the 1964 Newspaper Enterprise Association selection.

Professional career

Early career (1964-1967)
Jones was first drafted by the NBA's Los Angeles Lakers with a fifth round pick (43rd overall) in the 1963 NBA draft, however he played  another college season instead of turning professional.(see College career).
He then re-entered the 1964 NBA draft where he was chosen in the third round (20th overall pick) by the Philadelphia 76ers.
During the 1964-65 season he was sent by the Sixers to the Wilkes-Barre Barons of the Eastern League where he averaged 20 points per game. He was recalled to Philadelphia on 2 March 1965 due to injuries to backcourt players. At the end of an NBA season where he had averaged 5.7 points in 23 games, Jones was released.

Following his release, Jones played from 1965 to 1967 in the Eastern League, again with Wilkes-Barre. He was part of the Baltimore Bullets pre-season squad but was released in October 1966 and returned to the Barons.

Denver Rockets (1967-1970)
When the American Basketball Association was created in 1967, Jones called and wrote to every team in the league, the Denver Rockets were the only one to answer. He signed a $10,000 contract with the Rockets, the Eastern League disputed it and he had to stay in the team plane during his first game in Pittsburgh to avoid a subpoena.

Thanks to his excellent jump-shooting, Jones became a major player for Denver and the ABA in general, making three consecutive All-ABA First Teams from 1967 to 1970. He scored 30 points or more in 23 consecutive games during the 1968–69 ABA season. This included 52 points in a 133-123 win over the Houston Mavericks on 21 March 1969 which equalled his own club record. During this match he became the first ABA player to score over 2,000 points in a season. He finished the regular season with a league-leading 2,133 points as Denver lost in the playoffs first round to the Oakland Oaks.

Jones reached 5,000 career ABA points on 15 January 1970, becoming the first player in the league to do so. He scored 23 points against the Dallas Chaparrals to reach the mark, including two free-throws at the end of the game to secure the win for Denver. During the 1969-70 season he averaged 24.9 points in the regular season and 26.6 during the playoffs as the Rockets lost in the West finals. 
He was the top scorer of the 1970 ABA All-Star Game with 30 points, adding 6 rebounds and 5 assists. As the ABA Players' Association (ABAPA) President, Jones and the ABAPA threatened to sit out the game if the association was not recognized by ABA owners. They eventually arrived at the Indiana State Fairgrounds Coliseum at 1:39 PM, only twenty minutes before the game start.

Despite his tally, Jones was pipped to the All-Star Game MVP award (and assorted prizes such as a one-year Dodge Challenger lease) by Denver teammate Spencer Haywood.
This reflected Denver's payroll where Jones was replaced as the Rockets' highest-paid player by Haywood, a rookie, when he signed in 1969. In fact Haywood's $1.9 million contract (which included a $50,000 signing bonus) dwarfed Jones' $23,000 per year. Though Haywood left for the NBA after one season (as his contract deferred most of his salary for decades), Jones wasn't offered a revalued contract. He protested (once wearing a "railroad suit, claiming that was all he could afford") and obtained a trade to another team.
Jones was traded to the Floridians in June 1970 when Denver sent him, Greg Wittman and a No. 2 draft pick to the Floridians in exchange for Don Sidle, Larry Cannon and a No. 1 draft pick.
His Denver career ended with averages of 25.4 points and 4.2 assists in 226 regular-season games and 25.1 points and 5.6 assists in 20 playoff games.

Later ABA career (1970-1973)
Jones joined the Floridians as they replaced their entire squad after finishing the 1969-70 season with a 23-61 record. Jones and teammate Mack Calvin contributed a 51.5 point average during the 1970-71 season which was the highest scoring backcourt ever in professional basketball. 
He averaged over 20 points for the Floridians over two seasons in which they reached the playoffs.
However the club struggled with attendances and the first round playoff loss to the Virginia Squires on 6 April 1972 was their final game.
The ABA brought the club and folded it, organising a dispersal draft in June where the four worst ABA teams had the first picks on Floridians and Pittsburgh Condors players. The Utah Stars selected Jones with their third pick.

Jones did not fit in at Utah, where he was the No. 4 guard as the team had many shooters and he was said to be weak on defense and team play. He left the team in December as he was exchanged for Bob Warren in a straight swap with the Dallas Chaparrals. 
He reached 10,000 career ABA points during an 11 February 1973 game against the San Diego Conquistadors, becoming the fourth ABA player to reach the milestone during the season. He contributed a season-best 30 points, including a layup six seconds from time that helped claim an overtime 115-113 win for the Chaparrals.

At the end of the season Jones was placed on waivers by the Chaparrals and was not claimed by another club. It was speculated that his tenure of the head of the Players' Association discouraged clubs from signing the former all-time ABA scoring leader. He claimed no ABA team even called him to make a lower salary offer.

NBA return and retirement (1973-1975)
Having considered ending his professional career to finish a doctorate in counseling, Jones was offered a lifeline by Gene Shue, coach of his former NBA team Philadelphia, who signed him for the Sixers. The Sixers had finished the previous season with a 9-73 record, the worst in the history of the NBA. Hoping to prove those who considered him "over the hill" wrong, Jones contributed double figure scoring while starting eight of ten games between November and December as the Sixers won five times to reach a 9-15 record. This included 20 points in a 108-106 overtime win over the Houston Rockets and an NBA career-best 22 in a 20 November win over the Kansas City-Omaha Kings. 
He finished the 1973–74 NBA season averaging 10 points per game, following which he was released by the Sixers in October 1974.

In November, he participated in the European Professional Basketball League (EPBL) draft with other free agents. He was signed by the Munich Eagles to both play for and coach the Germany-based club.
He was one of the best players in the league, averaging 23 points (second best for the league) and a league-topping 7 assists per game when the season prematurely ended in March after 30 games.

Coaching career
After his first coaching experience in the EPBL, Jones was hired by another former European coach, Herb Brown, when he joined the Detroit Pistons in 1976. He served as assistant coach with the Pistons for two NBA seasons, keeping his post when Brown was fired in 1977. He was not retained for the 1978–79 season after incoming coach Dick Vitale hired other assistants such as long-time friend Richie Adubato.

Jones was then the head coach of the Las Vegas Dealers of the Western Basketball Association during its inaugural 1978-79 season following which the unstable league folded.

Jones next served as director of player personnel for the Women's Professional Basketball League until the league folded in 1981.
His following position was also in women's basketball, coaching his hometown team, the Columbus Minks, in the Women's American Basketball Association (WABA). 
The WABA played its only season from October to November 1984, its last game before folding was the All-Star Game on the 16th of December where Jones coached the All-Star team against champions Dallas Diamonds.

Personal
After his playing career, Jones worked as a state corrections official in Columbus.
Married with two daughters and one son, he conducts free summer basketball camps for youngsters in his hometown. He credits his high school coach Jackie Moore for helping him "go from a "poor student to an honor student" and wants to follow his example in helping youths.

Notes

References

1942 births
Living people
African-American basketball players
American men's basketball players
Basketball coaches from Ohio
Basketball players from Columbus, Ohio
Dallas Chaparrals players
Denver Rockets players
Detroit Pistons assistant coaches
Forwards (basketball)
Guards (basketball)
Los Angeles Lakers draft picks
Miami Floridians players
Philadelphia 76ers draft picks
Philadelphia 76ers players
Sportspeople from Columbus, Ohio
Toledo Rockets men's basketball players
Utah Stars players
Western Basketball Association coaches
Wilkes-Barre Barons players
21st-century African-American people
20th-century African-American sportspeople